An equalising beam, equalising lever or equalising bar ( or Ausgleichhebel) links the suspension of two or more adjacent axles of a vehicle with more than two axles, especially railway locomotives. Its job is to provide 'compensated' springing, i.e. to ensure an even and statically determinate distribution of load to all the axles on uneven terrain or poorly laid track. The function of an equalising lever thus corresponds roughly to that of axle compensators or rockers (Achswippen).

Notes

References 

Automotive suspension technologies
Rail technologies